Giuris margaritacea, the snakehead gudgeon, Aporos sleeper, or ornate sleeper, is a species of fish in the family Eleotridae found in marine, brackish, and fresh waters from Madagascar to Melanesia. This species is important to the local peoples as a food fish. This species is the only known member of the genus Giuris.

References

External links
 Photograph

Eleotridae
Monotypic fish genera
Fish described in 1837
Taxa named by Achille Valenciennes